DyNet is the communications network and communications protocol for Dynalite lighting automation and building automation. It is now part of Philips Lighting.

Design 
The network runs on a 4-twisted-pair cable of 100Ω 100 MHz CAT5E [1] or a flat cable with RS485 serial port, usually with a RJ-12 connector. A daisy-chain serial network topology is strongly recommended with no stubs. The recommended cable colour-coding is:

Green/White pair  =  paralleled for GND

Orange/White pair  =  paralleled for +12V

Blue/White pair  =  blue for DATA+    and white for DATA-

Brown/White pair  = spare or shield if unshielded cable is used.

References 

Lighting
Building automation